"Välkommen in" is a single by Swedish singer Veronica Maggio, from her third studio album Satan i gatan. It was released in Sweden as a digital download on 6 June 2011. The song peaked at number two on the Swedish Singles Chart.

Track listing
Digital download
 "Välkommen In" (Radio Edit) - 3:13
 "Välkommen In" (Instrumental Version) - 3:35

Credits and personnel
Lead vocals – Veronica Maggio
Producers – Christian Walz
Music/Lyrics – Christian Walz, Patrik Berggren, Veronica Maggio, Paloma Faith

Charts

Weekly charts

Year-end charts

Release history

References

2011 singles
Veronica Maggio songs
Songs written by Christian Walz
Songs written by Paloma Faith
Songs written by Veronica Maggio
Universal Music Group singles
2011 songs